Trinidad Ernesto Timoteo Francisco Icaza Sánchez (January 26, 1866 – 1935) was a Mexican painter and an ambitious horse rider, who got known for hundreds of horse and rider oil paintings, why he was also called the "charro pintor".

Biography 
Ernesto Icaza was one of four children of Joaquín de Icaza Mora and his second wife María de la Luz Victoria Sánchez Colomo. His mother died in 1881. On February 25, 1891, he married Diega María Ángela Cruzado Basabe. They had one girl: María de la Luz Icaza Cruzado. It is unknown, if he studied painting or if he was self-trained. He also painted some typical Mexican murals between 1910 and 1920. His works are findable in notable galleries and museums, many of them are private owned.

Literature 
 Luis Ortíz Macedo: Ernesto Icaza: el charro pintor. (Spanish),

References

External links 
 
 

Mexican muralists
1866 births
1935 deaths
Mexican male equestrians
19th-century Mexican painters
Mexican male painters
20th-century Mexican painters
19th-century Mexican male artists
20th-century Mexican male artists